Telat Üzüm (born 12 February 1963) is a Turkish football manager and former player.

As a player, he played for clubs like 1. FC Köln, Karlsruher SC and Fenerbahçe SK.

As a coach, he was an assistant coach at Beşiktaş J.K. and Bayer Leverkusen. He also coached youth clubs in Germany, later on he worked as a head coach for Bani Yas Club in the United Arab Emirates. In 2007, Üzüm was fired from his position as Asante Kotoko manager.

References

1963 births
Living people
Turkish footballers
Turkish football managers
Fenerbahçe S.K. footballers
1. FC Köln players
Karlsruher SC players
2. Bundesliga players
Place of birth missing (living people)
Baniyas SC managers
Association football midfielders
Asante Kotoko S.C. managers
Ghana Premier League managers
Real Tamale United managers
Expatriate football managers in Ghana
Footballers from Istanbul